Castelgrande may refer to:

 Castelgrande, Basilicata, a town in the Province of Potenza, Italy
 Castelgrande (castle), one of the Three Castles of Bellinzona, Switzerland